Sacra may refer to :

 Bibliotheca Sacra, the theological journal published by Dallas Theological Seminary
 Harmonia Sacra, a Mennonite shape note hymn and tune book
 Isola Sacra, an island in the Lazio region of Italy south of Rome
 Nomina sacra, the tradition of abbreviated writing of titles in early Greek language Holy Scripture
 Sacra (ancient Rome), transactions related to the worship of the gods
 Sacra conversazione, a depiction of the Madonna with infant Jesus amidst a group of saints
 Sacra Corona Unita, a Mafia-like criminal organization from Apulia
 Sacra di San Michele, a religious complex on Mount Pirchiriano
 Sacra jam splendent, the opening words of the Roman Catholic hymn for Matins
 Via Sacra, the main street of ancient Rome

See also
 Sacrum (disambiguation)